Liam Twomey (born 3 April 1967) is a medical doctor and former Irish Fine Gael politician who served as a Teachta Dála (TD) for the Wexford constituency from 2002 to 2007 and 2011 to 2016.

Early life and education
Twomey was born in Bealad, Clonakilty in County Cork. He was educated at St. Finbarr's Seminary and Trinity College Dublin. He is married to Elizabeth O'Sullivan and they have three children.

Career
He worked as a General practitioner (GP) before entering public office in 2002. Before his election to Dáil Éireann, Twomey was Chairman of the Wexford Branch of the Irish Medical Organisation.

Politics
At the 2002 general election, Twomey was elected to the Dáil as an independent TD for the Wexford constituency, on a campaign of highlighting the deficiencies in the Irish health service. He joined Fine Gael in September 2004. He was the opposition spokesperson on Health from 2004 to 2007.

He lost his seat at the 2007 general election, being eliminated after the 6th count. He was subsequently elected to the 23rd Seanad in July 2007 for the Cultural and Educational Panel. He was the Fine Gael Finance Spokesperson in the Seanad from 2007 to 2011.

At the 2011 general election he was again elected as a TD for Wexford.

Twomey represented Fine Gael in the Oireachtas delegation that met the Bundestag's Budgetary and European Affairs committees in Berlin, Germany in late January 2012. In January 2015 he was appointed Chair of the Oireachtas Joint Committee for Finance Public Expenditure and Reform.

On 17 July 2015 he announced that he would not stand in the 2016 general election.

References

External links

 

1967 births
Living people
Alumni of Trinity College Dublin
Fine Gael TDs
Independent TDs
Members of the 23rd Seanad
Members of the 29th Dáil
Members of the 31st Dáil
Politicians from County Cork
21st-century Irish medical doctors
Fine Gael senators